The DR37-P is an HDR monitor produced by BrightSide Technologies Inc. in 2005. It makes use of the IMLED technology. The targeted customers are industries like medical, CAD, film post-production, geophysical data or satellite imaging.

External links
 Review at bit-tech website

Computing output devices
Products introduced in 2005